Miss Universe Malaysia 2014, the 48th edition of the Miss Universe Malaysia, was held on 19 December 2013 at Setia City Convention Centre, Shah Alam, Selangor. Sabrina Benett of Perak was crowned by the outgoing titleholder, Carey Ng of Putrajaya at the end of the event. She then represented Malaysia at the Miss Universe 2014 pageant in Miami, United States.

Placements

Judges 

 Wan Ahmad Wan Abas
 Reshmonu
 Carmen Soo
 Andrew Tan
 Sazzy Falak
 Dr Daniel Yap
 Miko Au

Special awards

Contestants 
Official 19 Finalists of Miss Universe Malaysia 2014.

Top 40 
 The contestant that was chosen as official candidate.

Crossovers 

Miss Tourism Queen International Borneo
 2015 - Livonia Ricky Guing (Unplaced)

Miss Global International Malaysia
 2015 - Livonia Ricky Guing (2nd Runner-up)
 2013 - Livonia Ricky Guing (Top 6)

Miss India Malaysia
 2013 - Sabrina Beneett (2nd Runner-up)

Miss Earth Malaysia
 2012 - Livonia Ricky Guing (Unplaced)

Miss Selangor Kebaya
 2011 - Sabrina Beneett (Winner)

Dewi Remaja (Miss Teen Malaysia)
 2010 - Shangkharee Nadarajan (2nd Runner-up)

Miss Borneo Beautiful 
 2009 - Livonia Ricky Guing (Winner)

References

External links

2014 beauty pageants
2014 in Malaysia
2014